Lafresguimont-Saint-Martin is a commune in the Somme department in Hauts-de-France in northern France.

Geography

History
The commune was created by the amalgamation of four separate communes in 1972 : Montmarquet, Lafresnoye, Guibermesnil and Laboissière-Saint-Martin. The present name is a combination of the older names.

Population

See also
Communes of the Somme department

References

Communes of Somme (department)